Brandywine Building and Loan Assoc. Rowhouses is a set of six historic rowhouses located in East Fallowfield Township, Chester County, Pennsylvania. They were built in 1913, and consist of six two-story, two bay rowhouse dwellings. They are constructed of brick and are in the Italianate style.

It was added to the National Register of Historic Places in 1985.

References

Houses on the National Register of Historic Places in Pennsylvania
Italianate architecture in Pennsylvania
Houses completed in 1913
Houses in Chester County, Pennsylvania
1913 establishments in Pennsylvania
National Register of Historic Places in Chester County, Pennsylvania